Ákos Géza Kovács (7 April 1903 - 3 November 1980) was an internationally renowned Hungarian radiologist.

Biography 

After finishing the Medical School of the Pázmány Péter Catholic University in Budapest, Kovács became interested in radiology (a very new diagnostic field at that time), and studied its methods in different laboratories in Hungary and abroad. He was involved in the development of new radiological methods with the aim of overcoming the most important shortcoming of standard plain radiography that produces a single-directional image. His results were published in major international scientific journals of radiology.

Kovács who worked for the St. John's Hospital (1929-1952) and the St. Rokus Hospital (1952-1974) in Budapest, Hungary. He is credited with discovering a new method of X-ray imaging of the lowermost lumbar intervertebral foramen (named after him as the Kovacs method).

Selected publications

References 

1903 births
1980 deaths
Hungarian radiologists